Phoenix Racing is a motor racing team based at the Nürburgring in Germany. The team competes in series such as the Deutsche Tourenwagen Masters and FIA GT1 World Championship and was the winner of the 2022 24 Hours of Nürburgring with the car #15.

History

Phoenix Racing competed in the German Supertouring Championship in 1999 with Michael Bartels and Arnd Meier driving Audi A4s.

The team moved to the revived Deutsche Tourenwagen Masters series in 2000, running Opel Astra V8 Coupes, with Manuel Reuter finishing as runner-up and Bartels finishing seventh. The team also won the 24 Hours of Nürburgring in a Porsche GT3-R with Bartels, Uwe Alzen, Altfrid Heger and Bernd Mayländer as drivers. Phoenix repeated this victory in 2003 in an Opel Astra with Reuter, Timo Scheider, Volker Strycek and Marcel Tiemann. Opel began to struggle in the DTM in 2001, with Reuter the best Opel in ninth position and Phoenix teammate Yves Oliver finishing down in 22nd place. Phoenix and Opel never won another DTM race up until the end of 2005, when the manufacturer withdrew.

For 2006, there was a need for more cars to be run by the remaining two manufacturers, Mercedes-Benz and Audi. This led to Phoenix running one-year-old Audi A4s from the 2006 season onwards. In 2011 Martin Tomczyk won the DTM drivers title for Phoenix at the penultimate race in Valencia, with 3 victories, 7 total podiums, and 1 pole position. In 2013, Mike Rockenfeller took the title in the 2013 Deutsche Tourenwagen Masters season with one race remaining having 2 wins and 3 second places, driving the Audi A5.

Phoenix Racing also began competing in the FIA GT Championship in 2006, with Jean-Denis Délétraz and Andrea Piccini finishing the season as runners-up in an Aston Martin DBR9. For 2007 the team joined up with Toine Hezemans' Carsport Holland team to form Phoenix Carsport. Deletraz and Mike Hezemans finished in third place in the standings racing a Corvette C6.R. In 2008, Hezemans and Fabrizio Gollin finished as runners-up for the team. In 2009, Carsport returned to running their team with Peka Racing, but Phoenix and Carsport will again partner each other in 2010 for the first season of the FIA GT1 World Championship.

Phoenix Racing became an Audi Sport factory-supported team in 2009, competing at the Blancpain Endurance Series and 24 Hours of Nürburgring with an Audi R8 GT3 LMS. In 2012, the team won the Bathurst 12 Hour, the 24 Hours of Nürburgring and the 24 Hours of Spa. They also won the 2014 24 Hours of Nürburgring and the 2016 Sepang 12 Hours.

References

External links

 

German auto racing teams
Auto racing teams established in 1999
1999 establishments in Germany
Deutsche Tourenwagen Masters teams
Porsche Supercup teams
FIA GT Championship teams
FIA GT1 World Championship teams
ADAC GT Masters teams
International GT Open teams
Blancpain Endurance Series teams
TCR Asia Series teams
Super GT teams
Audi in motorsport